Thomas Dickson (1824 – July 31, 1884) was an English-American industrialist who manufactured steam engines, boilers and locomotives, and was the President of the Delaware and Hudson Railroad.

Early life
Thomas Dickson was born in Leeds, England in 1824, and died in Morristown, New Jersey.

Dickson and his family immigrated to Nova Scotia in 1835. In 1836, Dickson's family moved to Carbondale, Pennsylvania, where he worked as a mule driver for the Delaware and Hudson Railroad.

Early career 
In 1855, Thomas Dickson joined his brothers John and George and friends Maurice and Charles Wurts, and opened a small machine shop and foundry under the name of "Dickson & Co". In 1856, George Scranton persuaded the company to relocate to the newly incorporated Scranton, Pennsylvania. In 1862, The company incorporated as the Dickson Manufacturing Company. Thomas was president from 1856 though 1867.

Later life 
In 1859, Dickson was appointed the superintendent of coal for the Delaware and Hudson Canal Company. He quickly rose through the ranks and in 1869, Dickson resigned from the Dickson Manufacturing Company and became president of the Delaware and Hudson Railroad. He remained in the position until his death in 1884.

Dickson was listed as the director for at least 24 companies during his life.

The borough of Dickson City, Pennsylvania, is named after Thomas Dickson.

References 

1824 births
1884 deaths
Delaware and Hudson Railway
British emigrants to the United States
People from Carbondale, Pennsylvania
19th-century American railroad executives
American industrialists